Anis Selmouni (born 15 of March 1979) is a Moroccan athlete, specialist middle distance.

He won the 5000m gold medal at the 2009 Mediterranean Games.

Achievements

Personal bests
1500 metres - 3:35.35 min (2003)
Mile - 3:52.66 min (2003)
3000 metres - 7:47.68 min (2006)

External links

1979 births
Living people
Moroccan male middle-distance runners
Athletes (track and field) at the 2008 Summer Olympics
Olympic athletes of Morocco
Mediterranean Games gold medalists for Morocco
Mediterranean Games medalists in athletics
Athletes (track and field) at the 2009 Mediterranean Games
20th-century Moroccan people
21st-century Moroccan people